Google Play Pass is an app subscription service by Google for Android devices. It was launched on September 23, 2019 in the United States. In July 2020, the service launched as planned in other Western countries, including Germany, Australia, and Canada. Subscribers can access the included apps and games without ads and in-app purchases for a monthly or yearly subscription. There are over 460 curated titles available under the service, which range from puzzles to podcasts. In March 2022, Google Play Pass launched in India.

As of July 17, 2022, it is currently available in 93 countries/regions.

Features 
Google Play Pass gives users access to a curated catalogue of a variety of apps and games taken directly from the Google Play Store without any ads or the need for additional in-app purchases. Play Pass can be shared with up to five other family members.

App developers who wish to offer their app as part of the subscription can apply to be considered for inclusion in the service and according to Google, "will receive royalties based on algorithmic methods that incorporate signals which capture how users value all types of content".

See also 
 Apple Arcade
 GameClub

References

External links 
 
 Official Developer Guide

Pass
Play Pass
Subscription services